123rd Street is one of four Metra railroad stations in Blue Island, Illinois, along the Beverly Branch of the Rock Island District Line, and five within Blue Island generally. In Metra's zone-based fare system, 123rd Street is in zone C. As of 2018, 123rd Street is the 211th busiest of Metra's 236 non-downtown stations, with an average of 53 weekday boardings.

As of 2022, 123rd Street is served as a flag stop by 20 trains in each direction on weekdays, by 10 inbound trains and 11 outbound trains on Saturdays, and by eight trains in each direction on Sundays.

123rd Street was originally in zone D of Metra’s zone-based fare system, but was moved into zone C as part of a pilot program that lowered fares on the Rock Island and Metra Electric Districts.

Parking is available on the northeast side of the tracks north along 123rd Street. The station is little more than an enclosed sheltered platform, and is a flag stop. No bus connections are available.

References

External links

Station from 123rd Street from Google Maps Street View

Metra stations in Illinois
Blue Island, Illinois
Railway stations in Cook County, Illinois